is a former Japanese football player.

Playing career
Tanikawa was born in Shizuoka on April 25, 1980. He joined J1 League club Shimizu S-Pulse from youth team in 1999. On March 27, he debuted as left side back against Kashiwa Reysol. However he could hardly play in the match until 2001. In August 2001, he moved to J2 League club Ventforet Kofu on loan. After the transfer, he played full time in all matches as center back. In 2002, he returned to Shimizu S-Pulse. However he could hardly play in the match. In 2003, he moved to United States and joined New Hampshire Phantoms. In 2004, he returned to Japan and joined J2 club Mito HollyHock. However he could not play many matches. In 2005, he moved to Prefectural Leagues club FC Machida Zelvia. He played many matches and the club was promoted to Regional Leagues from 2006. He retired end of 2007 season.

Club statistics

References

External links

1980 births
Living people
Association football people from Shizuoka Prefecture
Japanese footballers
Japanese expatriate footballers
J1 League players
J2 League players
Shimizu S-Pulse players
Ventforet Kofu players
Mito HollyHock players
FC Machida Zelvia players
Association football midfielders
Japanese expatriate sportspeople in the United States
Expatriate soccer players in the United States
Seacoast United Phantoms players
USL Second Division players